Gugan Gupta is the founder and CEO of Arise IIP, Arise IS and Arise P&L, three branches of a pan-African industrial operator and developer.

Early life and education 
Gagan Gupta was born on May 10, 1975, in Rajasthan, India. He holds a Bachelor of Commerce from Delhi University and an All India Rank from the Institute of Chartered Accountants of India (ICAI).

Career

Early career 
A chartered accountant and management controller who has worked in the finance departments of the Indian subsidiaries of Reebok and Reckitt Benckiser, he moved to Libreville (Gabon) following his appointment by Olam to set up the Arise project at age 33.

In 2008, he joined Olam Gabon, and, starting in 2010, was successively appointed Country Manager, Chief Operation Officer in Central Africa, Business Development Director at Olam International.

During this period, in Gabon, Gagan Gupta set up large-scale agribusiness projects in 2010 based on public-private partnerships (PPPs), the Nkok Special Economic Zone (GSEZ), including the plantation of 58,000 ha of oil palm, 28,000 ha of rubber trees and 20,000 ha of various crops through the "Graines" program. GSEZ is the first PPP in the infrastructure sector between Olam International Ltd. (40.5%), the Africa Finance Corporation (AFC) (21%) and the Republic of Gabon. This industrial park specializes in wood processing, gathers more than 140 investors from 18 countries, and operates in 17 sectors. According to Les Echos, GSEZ will have created 7,000 direct jobs and 16,000 indirect jobs by 2022 and will have 85 operational plants by the end of the same year.

Until 2017, Gagan Gupta is undertaking other major infrastructure projects in Gabon. These include the GSEZ Infras rural electrification program, the management of Libreville airport, the Owendo Mineral Port (OMP), inaugurated in August 2016, or the New Owendo International Port (NOIP), operational since June 2017.

Creation of Arise 
In 2018, the GSEZ business model is rolled out in West Africa under the name of Arise, Arise is a pan-African company that designs, finances, builds and manages industrial estates, roads, ports and other critical infrastructure.

In late 2019, Arise's business was reorganized into three distinct entities : Arise Ports & Logistics (P&L), dedicated to port logistics operations, Arise Integrated Industrial Platforms (IIP), focused on the development of industrial ecosystems, and Arise Infrastructure Services (IS) dedicated to all other infrastructure.

In February 2021, Olam International entered into definitive agreements with Africa Transformation and Industrialization Fund, an Abu Dhabi-based investment fund established by Arise employees. The two companies closed the sale of Olam's remaining shares in Arise Integrated Industrial Platforms (Arise IIP) and Arise Infrastructure Services (Arise IS).

Deployment of Arise 
Already established in Gabon, Arise IIP is rapidly expanding its activity in Côte d'Ivoire (November 2020), in Bénin (February 2021), in Togo (August 2021), in Nigéria (April 2022), in Rwanda (September 2022), in Democratic Republic of the Congo (September 2022), in Congo and in Senegal. Under his leadership, Arise is creating a model for African countries to improve the profitability of their commodity production through targeted investments. Reducing exports of raw materials from Africa to Asia and other regions in favor of local processing reduces carbon emissions, shortens supply chains, and reshapes national logistics capacity.

In 2021, GSEZ receives ISO 14064-1 "carbon neutral" certification. Gagan Gupta sees this as a "replicable framework [for] sustainable transformation in Africa". Within GSEZ, the Tracer agency was also created, in partnership with Forest Resources Management and Brainforest, to certify the origin of processed wood and thus fight against illegal logging in Gabon.

In June 2021, Gagan Gupta inaugurates the Adétikopé Industrial Platform (AIP) in Togo, dedicated to the cotton industry and a government partnership of over $200 million covering an area of 400 hectares. Togo's exports include cotton, soybeans, cashews, timber and limestone (marble). These 60,000 tons of raw cotton exports are worth $75 million, but with local manufacturing, they could reach about $1 billion by 2025.

In June 2022, Gupta leads Arise IIP's collaboration with Afreximbank to set up laboratories for the control, inspection and certification of goods produced by users of Arise's industrial parks, based on the African Quality Assurance Center (AQAC). The objective is to remedy non-compliance with international standards, technical regulations and certification of local products intended for export.

That same month, he led Arise's agreement with Congo to develop two new industrial public-private partnerships in Ouesso and Pointe-Noire, focusing on the processing of forest and agricultural products. The projects aim to promote and attract multi-sectoral and commercial investments in the country and to develop primary, secondary and tertiary wood and agri-food processing industries.

In September 2022, in Rwanda, Gagan Gupta leads the negotiations for the signing of a framework agreement for the development of an industrial zone in Bugesera. The latter is intended to enable multi-sectoral industrial and commercial investments in the country, in order to develop the local transformation of raw materials into high value-added products. The Rwanda Special Economic Zone is to be fully operational by 2025, with construction starting in 2022.

The same month, he leads the negotiations of the agreement concluded by Arise with the DRC to develop the industrial zone of Kin-Malebo, 40 km from Kinshasa. Focused on the processing of forestry and agricultural products, the zone will also host companies specializing in the pharmaceutical sector, plastic recycling, household appliances, electric vehicles and other processing industries.

Private life 
Gagan Gupta is a Hindu, married with two children.

He played a key role in the creation of the Gabon Marathon, by making Olam the first official sponsor of this competition.

Awards 
Gagan Gupta was named vice president of the Giants Club as a reward fostering sustainable and environmentally friendly industrialization, as well as the establishment of Africa's first carbon-neutral special economic zone (GSEZ). The Giants Club supports African governments in the protection of their natural resources, and promotes economic development.

References

1975 births
Living people
Gabonese businesspeople